The Tornado is a 1917 American short film directed and co-written by John Ford, who at that time was credited as "Jack Ford". Filmed in California, the two-reel Western starred Ford as well, with a supporting cast that included Jean Hathaway, John Duffy, Peter Gerald, Elsie Thornton, and Duke Worne. This short is generally cited by film historians to be Ford's debut film as a director, although he had served as an assistant director in some earlier productions directed by his elder brother Francis Ford. Produced by Bison Motion Pictures and distributed by Universal Pictures, this short is currently classified as a lost film.

Cast
 John Ford as Jack Dayton (as Jack Ford)
 Jean Hathaway as Jack's mother
 Peter Gerald as Pendleton, banker from Rock River (as Pete Gerald)
 Elsie Thornton as Bess, Jack's daughter
 Duke Worne as Lesparre, the lead of Cayote gang
 John Duffy as Slick, Jack's partner

Production and reception
John Ford, who was only 23 years old at the time of this short's production, reportedly got drunk while filming and told producers that he simply ordered the actors what to do and then recorded the action.

Reviews
The film was defined like: "In his hand-to-hand struggle in the cabin and the jump from the cabin roof to the back of his horse, Jack Ford qualifies as a rough-riding expert". Jack Ford declared The Soul Herder as the first film he directed because he dismissed The Tornado and called it a "brunch of stunts".

See also
 List of American films of 1917

References and notes

References

Notes

Bibliography

External links
 

1917 films
1917 Western (genre) films
1917 short films
1917 lost films
1917 directorial debut films
American silent short films
American black-and-white films
Films directed by John Ford
Lost Western (genre) films
Lost American films
Silent American Western (genre) films
Universal Pictures short films
1910s American films
1910s English-language films